The West Australian Football League (WAFL) is an Australian rules football league based in Perth, Western Australia. The league currently consists of ten teams, which play each other in a 20-round season usually lasting from March to September, with the top five teams playing off in a finals series, culminating in a Grand Final. The league also runs reserves, colts (under-19) and women's competitions.

The WAFL was founded in 1885 as the West Australian Football Association (WAFA), and has undergone a variety of name changes since then, re-adopting its current name in 2001. For most of its existence, the league was considered one of the traditional "big three" Australian rules football leagues, along with the Victorian Football League (VFL) and South Australian National Football League (SANFL). However, since the introduction of two Western Australia-based clubs into the VFL (later renamed the Australian Football League) – the West Coast Eagles in 1987 and the Fremantle Football Club in 1995 – the popularity and standard of the league has decreased to the point where it is considered a feeder competition to the AFL.

Although payments are made to players, it is generally considered to be a semi-professional competition. A salary cap of A$200,000 per club is in place. The league is currently affiliated with the two Western Australia-based AFL clubs. Players who are not selected to play with their respective AFL clubs instead play for allocated clubs in the WAFL. The competition is governed by the West Australian Football Commission, and based at Subiaco Oval.

Clubs

Current clubs
There are ten (10) teams that currently compete in the WAFL:

 Claremont played at the Claremont Showground from 1925 to 1927 and again from 2014 until 2016 when Claremont Oval was closed for re-development, and at Subiaco Oval from 1945 to 1947 when Claremont Oval was being rebuilt after a grandstand fire in 1944.
 East Fremantle played at Fremantle Oval from 1898 to 1952, excluding a period in 1906 where home games were played at East Fremantle Oval, and at the WACA Ground since 2022 whilst East Fremantle Oval is re-developed.
 East Perth played at Wellington Square from 1902 to 1909, at Perth Oval from 1910 to 1987 and from 1990 to 1999, and at the WACA Ground during 1988 and 1989. East Perth were aligned with West Coast between 2014 and 2018.
 Perth played at the WACA Ground from 1899 to 1958 and during 1987 and 1988.
 Subiaco played at Shenton Park between 1901 and 1905, at Mueller Park in 1906 and 1907, and at Subiaco Oval from 1908 to 2003 .
 West Perth played at Leederville Oval from 1915 to 1993.
 West Coast mainly play away games, selling their home games to other clubs, when they do play home games it is at their training base at Lathlain Park

 (R = Reserves for AFL Seniors)

Former clubs
Ten other clubs formerly competed in the competition:

 Claremont known as Claremont-Cottesloe from 1926 to 1934.
 Peel have been aligned with Fremantle since 2014
 Perth was known as Victoria Park from 1934 to 1935
Fremantle Football Club (II) was known as Unions Football Club from 1886 to 1889.
 Up until the turn of the century, there were a limited number of grounds available for use by the clubs, with all clubs sharing the different grounds. As such, the Esplanade Park, Fremantle and Fremantle Park in Fremantle, and the Old Recreation Ground (Wellington Square) and the New Recreation Ground (Esplanade Reserve) in Perth were all used as "home" grounds by the above teams.
 The High School withdrew from the competition due to lack of players two rounds into the inaugural season.
 Rovers were a "wandering" team – they had no home ground, and drew players from all over the metropolitan area.
 West Australian Football Club merged with Victorians in 1889 to form the Metropolitan Football Club, which in turn became the West Perth Football Club.
  In April 1889, West Perth was Victorians (1885–88) who merged with West Australian Football Club (1886–1888) to form Metropolitans (1889–90)

Competition timeline

Venues

Salary cap
The WAFL is a semi-professional competition and has a salary cap in place.
In 2016 the Total Player Payments cap is $294,000 for the non-AFL aligned clubs, while the cap for East Perth and Peel Thunder is $191,100.

Audience

Media

Television

In 2022, the WAFL signed a deal that will see 26 games including all finals matches broadcast on the Seven Network, with the remaining 72 matches to be available for streaming on the AFL's official app and AFL On Demand service.

Previously in January 2015, the WAFL announced a deal struck with the Seven Network, where under the arrangement, Seven agreed to a three-year deal involving the telecast of 18 home and away matches as well as all Finals matches, broadcast throughout Western Australia. Before this, the WAFL match of the round was broadcast on ABC throughout Western Australia every Saturday afternoon during the regular home and away season.  Matches were replayed nationwide on-demand from the ABC iView service and re-broadcast on the ABC2 channel early Friday morning at 2.30 am local time.

Radio
Radio stations which cover the competition include ABC Radio Perth, ABC Grandstand Digital, 91.3 SportFM, 107.3 HFM and KIX Country Digital.

Sponsorship
There is currently no naming rights partner of the WAFL, so the competition is officially known as the "WAFL Premiership". the naming rights previously held by Optus (2019-2021), And before that McDonald's (2015-2018) and earlier still AAMI (2010-2014).

Attendance
Attendance at WAFL matches dropped when each of the two Western Australian based AFL teams entered the league.  In recent years, however the attendances have increased slightly, with 2009 recording the first combined annual attendance of more than 200,000 since 1994.

A largest recent crowd was 24,638 at the 2010 WAFL Grand Final between Swan Districts and Claremont at Subiaco Oval. The all-time attendance record is 52,781 in 1979 for East Fremantle v South Fremantle at Subiaco Oval.

Patrons at the WAFL pay at the gates.
The following are relatively recent attendance figures.

Source(s): WAFL Fixtures & Results

History

Pre–1900: Formation and early years
Organised football in the Perth/Fremantle region of Western Australia dates back to 1881. Back then though rugby union was the dominant football code, with only one senior club, "Unions", playing Australian Rules.

In 1883 a second club, "Swans", emerged, but Australian Rules' growth remained much subdued compared to that of Victoria and South Australia.

However, in those days many young men of Perth's wealthier families were educated in Adelaide, the capital of South Australia.

On returning home from there they naturally wished to play the sport they'd grown up with and no doubt exerted some influence on their less affluent peers as to such. Coincidentally, the press at the time reported there was a growing dissatisfaction with rugby as a spectacle.

During the 1880s, the discoveries of gold, firstly in the Kimberley, Pilbara and Murchison regions, led to a dramatic increase in WA's population, including many players and supporters of Australian Rules from the eastern colonies.

In 1885 one of the leading rugby clubs, Fremantle, decided to change to Australian Rules. It was quickly joined by three other clubs – "Rovers", "Victorians", and a team of schoolboys from Perth High. The schoolboy side lasted just two matches, but the three other sides went on to contest what in retrospect was viewed as the first-ever official Western Australian Football Association (WAFA) premiership, won by Rovers. And virtually overnight Australian Rules football became the dominant code for the spectator as well.

However progress of Australian rules in Western Australia still lagged behind the big football cities of Melbourne, Adelaide and Geelong and is evidenced by the unstable nature of the clubs that participated in the early years.

In 1886 a new club Fremantle-based club Unions joined.

In 1887 Fremantle left the WAFA and the West Australian Football Club joined but they would only play two seasons before they disappeared.

In 1890 Unions would rename themselves Fremantle as those involved in the game saw the need to identify themselves with the region they were located in.

1891 saw two new clubs arrive, Centrals and East Perth, but they would be gone after one and two seasons respectively.

1898 saw the entry of East Fremantle to the league.

1899 would be the last season Fremantle would take part. Despite Unions/Fremantle being the most dominant club in the WAFA up to this point winning the competition 10 times in its 13 years of existence, problems with debt saw the club disappear and some people involved with the old entity formed South Fremantle Football Club in its place. Despite the fact that many involved with Fremantle moved onto South Fremantle the new club is not seen as a continuation of the old and did not lay claim to its proud records to that date.

1899 was also the last time Rovers would take part. The move to regionalisation which saw Unions take on the old Fremantle's name and colours made it difficult for this club that didn't represent a particular area to attract players. They folded and were immediately replaced by Perth Football Club who were promoted from the Perth First Rate Association.

Early 1900s
Major gold discoveries at Coolgardie and Kalgoorlie in 1892, coupled with a major international economic depression, caused immigration from the eastern colonies to accelerate not only to the Goldfields but also onto Perth. These migrants came from a climate where Australian Rules football was more popular and included a large number of footballers including some celebrated players.

The Goldfields competition (later known as the Goldfields Football League) was hence comparable in status and standard to the Perth competition for many years. (This was shown by the fact that it had a separate seat on the Australian National Football Council until 1919.)

The higher standard of play that followed helped to increase the game's popularity and increased the professionalism of the WAFA which in turn saw a more stable look come to the league which to this point saw teams frequently coming and going, not to mention problems with frequent crowd violence.

By 1901, the WAFA had grown to have six teams. Up to this point, five sides at most had been in the competition, and this number had invariably changed from year to year, as clubs came and went. And by 1906 there were eight teams: West Perth, East Perth, East Fremantle, South Fremantle, North Fremantle, Subiaco, Perth and Midland Junction.

Recent arrivals East Fremantle became the dominant force in the league winning 11 premierships from 1900 to 1918.

On 27 March 1907, the WAFA was renamed the West Australian Football League (WAFL).

The West Australian State Premiership was awarded to the winner of a contest played between the GNFL premiers and the WAFL premiers.  The contest was played intermittently between 1903 and 1924 and the winning team accorded the title Champions of Western Australia.

Unlike many other sporting competitions, the WAFL didn't go into recess during World War I, although two teams – North Fremantle and Midland Junction – were "casualties" of the war, competing for the last time in 1915 and 1917 respectively.

Between the wars
1919 saw East Perth win their first premiership, and they would go on to win 5 in a row – a national record until Port Adelaide managed 6 many years later.

In 1921, the WAFL followed the idea of the SANFL's Magarey Medal and introduced the Sandover Medal, for the fairest and best player over a season, as voted by the field umpires. The medal has been awarded annually ever since.

Claremont/Cottesloe entered the league in 1926, bringing the number of teams back to seven. They would rename the club to simply Claremont a few years later.

On Wednesday 12 October 1927, the WAFL was renamed the Western Australian National Football League (WANFL) – the "national" concept in the name being adopted by the SANFL, TANFL and other leagues when the Australian Football Council became the Australian National Football Council earlier in the year.

Swan Districts entered the league in 1934. The eight competing sides at this point still remain today and are often referred to as the "traditional eight clubs" as opposed to Peel who would join much later on.

Because of World War II, the league only ran an "under age" competition between 1942 and 1944. However, the three premierships won during this time are given equal status to any other, in official records (East Perth however don't give their 1944 premiership win equal status). All clubs competed, with the exception of Swan Districts who could not form a team in 1942, although they were back in 1943. The Sandover Medal was also presented each year.

Post-war

Western Australian football was particularly strong during the years immediately following World War II. The state side enjoyed unparalleled success, downing Victoria in each of the first three post war meetings as well as enjoying the better of their encounters with South Australia.

In 1952, the Avon Valley Football Association applied to enter a team in the WANFL, following concerns about its players being poached by Perth-based teams. It would have been based at Northam's Jubilee Oval. The proposal was raised again in 1954 but did not proceed.

South Fremantle were without dispute one of the strongest teams in Australia during much of the period 1947 to 1954, not only winning 6 premierships but also defeating many touring sides from Victoria and South Australia.

From 1956 to 1961 it would be East Perth's turn to dominate the WAFL with them featuring in all 6 Grand Finals of this period and coming out with 3 victories. Their team featured Graham Farmer who would leave at the end of the '61 season and carve out a reputation in the VFL as one of the game's greatest ever players.

The 1960s saw crowds get bigger and bigger, as WAFL football captured the hearts and minds of the WA public like never before, and in the 1970s and early 1980s it was easily the biggest show in town.

However, during this period more and more star WAFL players were looking to head to the Victorian Football League (VFL), enticed by the bigger money and the fact that it was more and more gaining a reputation as the "big" league.

This is perhaps best evidenced in that Victoria (i.e. the VFL representative team) had by far the best record in interstate games for a long time. But in 1977, when the first proper State of Origin match was played, it saw Western Australia inflict its biggest defeat on a Victorian team.

East Perth's 1961 loss to Swan Districts would see that side's first-ever premiership. Captain/coached by Haydn Bunton, Jr., they became the team of the early 1960s when they followed it up in 1962 and 1963 to make it three in a row.

The dominating sides of the late 1960s and early 1970s were the three Perth teams. Perth won 3 in a row from 1966 to 1968, and West Perth won in 1969 and 1971 captain/coached by Graham Farmer who had returned from over east. All 5 of these grand final wins came at the expense of East Perth who earned the bridesmaid tag in this era. However East Perth finally won through in the 1972 grand final.

After 1972 the competition was more evenly matched with every team winning a grand final over the next 10 years.

At this time crowds were as big as they ever were. The 1979 grand final was played before a record crowd of 52,781 and saw East Fremantle defeat archrivals South Fremantle.

1980s
In 1980, the WANFL dropped the "N" and the "ern" and reverted to being called the WAFL.

At the end of the 1980 season East Perth put in an application to join the VFL. The offer was withdrawn.

Crowds had been buoyed by State of Origin football that saw Western Australia's best players return home briefly, but this effect was short lived. Interest in the WAFL began a slow decline, as it became increasingly obvious that even larger numbers of the WAFL's best players were going to head east.

By 1983 the management of the WAFL itself acknowledged that economic crisis loomed. They approached the state government for financial aid, and were rewarded with a grant of $1.9 million. In response, the government wanted a full-scale investigation into the likely future financial demands of football.

This led to the formation of the West Australian Football Commission who functioned independently of the WAFL.

In 1986 the decision had been made that the WAFL needed to become involved in helping the VFL, where several clubs were also struggling financially, to become national.

Against a backdrop in which several WAFL clubs were looking to enter the VFL or in which a struggling Victorian club may be relocated to Perth, the WAFL decided to hastily form a new club to enter the VFL such that they could retain control of a West Australian presence in the situation.

Meanwhile, in the league Swan Districts won another hat-trick of premierships from 1982 to 1984.  East Fremantle, the WAFL's most successful club, won the centenary premiership in 1985 and in 1986 Subiaco had the honour to be the last club to win the premiership prior to Western Australia's participation in the national league.

Effect of VFL expansion and the AFL

The West Coast Eagles were formed and competed in the VFL for the first time in 1987 (the VFL was renamed the AFL in 1990).

With many of Western Australia's best players now competing in a team that represented Western Australia on a national scale, it was suddenly apparent that the WAFL was not the prime focus of the football public as crowds and media attention centred on the 'national' league.

In 1990 the league was renamed the Western Australian State Football League, but it had reverted to WAFL by 1991.

Another locally based AFL team, the Fremantle Football Club were formed in 1994, and this cemented the position of WAFL as a second-class competition. (Indeed, the 1991 introduction of the Adelaide Crows to the VFL/AFL meant that the SANFL was experiencing a similar decline to the WAFL.)

WAFL clubs have struggled ever since with their sudden demise from being technically equal to any VFL club, to feeder club status. However, they have enjoyed some benefits, such as the funds flowing from the WA-based AFL teams and the influx of talented players from other states, attempting to make a name for themselves.

In 1997, Peel Thunder – somewhat controversially – became the ninth WAFL club. Throughout their brief history, they have struggled to compete with the traditional eight clubs, which are generally opposed to their presence. This is partly because having an odd number of teams forces one team to have a bye each week.

Also in 1997, the WAFL was renamed Westar Rules, in an attempt to revamp the league's image. The name again reverted to WAFL in 2001 although retained the logo.

Recent years have seen the WAFL stabilise itself as a league a step down from the AFL. Having the best football players all playing in the AFL has lessened the standard of play; however this has recovered somewhat, with retired or delisted AFL players returning and young players coming through.  It is becoming fairly common, however, for young players to be drafted as 17- or 18-year-olds directly to the AFL and not play in the WAFL football for more than a few games.

Attendances have recovered slightly and in 2004, the league posted a total attendance of 202,797. The total attendance, including AFL games was a record 1,030,000.

In 2019 the  West Coast Eagles entered the Wafl so the teams are now 10.

Future
While the WAFL has not been as keen as the SANFL to include teams from other states, there have been proposals to include teams from regions unwanted by the AFL, and to serve as a second-tier national league.

The most pushed for expansion team was to be from Darwin, Northern Territory, formed as a representative club of the Northern Territory Football League, however the NT team opted to join the Queensland Australian Football League for the 2009 season, and moved to the newly created North East Australian Football League in 2011 after the top divisions of the Queensland AFL and AFL Canberra merged. In 2019 the WAFL partnered with the West Australian Women's Football League to create a new women's state league, the WAFL Women's. The league is run adjacent to the WAFL premiership.

Awards and records

Awards
The following awards are or were awarded each season:
The WAFL Premiership Cup for the winner of the WAFL Grand Final.
The Sandover Medal for the fairest & best player(s) in the WAFL.
The Simpson Medal for the best players in the WAFL Grand Final.
The Bernie Naylor Medal for the leading goalkicker during the home and away season.
The JJ Leonard Medal for the best coach during the season.
The Montgomery Medal for the best field umpire during the season.
The RP Rodriguez Shield for the best overall team, combining league, reserves and colts games. Click here for a list of winners.
The Prendergast Medal for the fairest & best player(s) in the reserves.
The Jack Clarke Medal for the fairest & best player(s) in the colts.
The WA State Premiership (1903–24), awarded to the winner of a match between the WAFA/WAFL premiers and the GFA/GFL premiers.

Premierships

East Fremantle has won the most premierships, with 29, most recently in 1998. West Perth rank second with 20 premierships, the most recent in 2022.

The reigning premiers (2022) are West Perth, winning its 20th premiership.

The first premiership was awarded in 1885, and was won by the Rovers Football Club, which disbanded in 1899.

Wooden spoons

Subiaco and Swan Districts have the equal most wooden spoons, with 21. Swan Districts most recent wooden spoon was in 2019, while Subiaco had their most recent in 1996.

The reigning wooden spooners (2022) are West Coast Eagles, with its 2nd wooden spoon.

Records

Team records
Highest score: 40.18 (258) – South Fremantle v West Perth 12.6 (78) at Fremantle Oval, Round 21, 1981
Lowest score (1898 onwards):
0.0 (0) – Subiaco v South Fremantle 12.23 (95) at North Fremantle Oval, 4 August 1906
0.0 (0) – Peel Thunder v Claremont 17.15 (117) at Rushton Park, 2004
Most premierships (club): 29 – East Fremantle
Most "wooden spoons": 21 – Subiaco & Swan Districts
Most successive finals appearances: 36 – East Fremantle (1916–1951)
Most consecutive unbeaten games: 35 – East Fremantle (1945–1947)
Most consecutive winless games: 27 – Subiaco (1903–1905)
Most Sandover Medals (club): 18 (East Perth)
Most Bernie Naylor Medals/Leading Goalkicker Awards (club): 21 (Subiaco)
Highest attendance: 52,781 at Subiaco Oval, 1979 WAFL Grand Final, East Fremantle v South Fremantle

Individual records
Most games: 367 – Mel Whinnen
Most consecutive games: 218 – Joel Cornelius, 1995–2006
Most goals: 1211 – Austin Robertson, Jr.
Most goals in a season: 167 – Bernie Naylor, 1953
Most Sandover Medals (player): 4 – Bill Walker, 1965–1967, 1970
Most Bernie Naylor Medals/Leading Goalkicker Awards (player): 8 – Austin Robertson, Jr., 1962; 1964–65; 1968–1972
Oldest player: 44 years
Youngest player: 14 years, 25 days, Stan Hussey (Centrals), 1891

West Australian Football Hall of Fame

On 12 March 2004, a West Australian Football Hall of Fame was formed when 81 former players, coaches, umpires, administrators and media representatives were inducted. More people have been inducted every year since then, and as of 2017, there are sixteen who have been elevated to 'Legend status':

 Haydn Bunton, Jr.
 Barry Cable
 George Doig
 Graham Farmer
 Stan Heal
 Johnny Leonard
 Steve Marsh
 Phillip Matson
 Denis Marshall
 Merv McIntosh
 George Moloney
 Graham Moss
 Jack Sheedy
 John Todd
 William "Nipper" Truscott
 Bill Walker

Top 25 Players over the Past 25 years
In March 2012, the Top 25 players over the Past 25 Years were announced, to recognise the WAFL performances of players, rather than the performances of Western Australian players in the AFL.  The judges were The West Australian's sports reporter Ross Lewis, Football Budget editor Tracey Lewis, Claremont CEO Todd Shimmon, former players Clint Roberts, Bill Monaghan, Todd Ridley plus historians Greg Wardell-Johnson and Steve Davies.

Other WAFL competitions

The WAFL has run a simultaneous reserves competition and colts (under-19s) competition for its clubs since 1925 and 1957 respectively. A fourths-grade premiership was held between 1965 and 1974. A senior women's competition was inaugurated in 2019.

See also 
 Australian rules football in Western Australia
 Western Australian State Premiership
 WAFL Women's

References

External links 
 
 WAFL FootyFacts
 Video of 2006 WAFL Highlights from the WAFL

 
Australian rules football competitions in Western Australia
1885 establishments in Australia
Sports leagues established in 1885
Professional sports leagues in Australia